Podarcis galerai is a species of lizard in the family Lacertidae. It is found in Spain.

References

Podarcis
Endemic reptiles of the Iberian Peninsula
Lizards of Europe
Reptiles described in 2020